Protection of Children Act is a stock short title used for legislation in the United Kingdom.

List
 The Prevention of Cruelty to, and Protection of, Children Act 1889
 The Protection of Children Act 1978
 The Protection of Children (Tobacco) Act 1986
 The Protection of Children Act 1999
 The Protection of Children (Scotland) Act 2003
 The Protection of Children and Prevention of Sexual Offences (Scotland) Act 2005

See also
List of short titles

Lists of legislation by short title